Andrew Arbuckle (born 12 April 1944) is a Scottish Liberal Democrat politician, and a former Member of the Scottish Parliament (MSP) for the Mid Scotland and Fife region. He was a Fife councillor until 2012. He was first elected as a councillor in 1986.

He replaced Keith Raffan at the Scottish Parliament after Raffan resigned in 2005. Arbuckle failed to win re-election at the 2007 Scottish Parliament election.

Arbuckle was the farming editor for the Dundee Courier from 1985 to 2005. He and his brother John published three farming-related books.

References

External links 
 

1944 births
Living people
Liberal Democrat MSPs
Scottish Liberal Democrat councillors
Members of the Scottish Parliament 2003–2007